Robert Burns (1789 – 1869) was a Scottish theological writer and church leader.

Biography
Burns was born at Bo'ness in 1789. He was educated at the University of Edinburgh, licensed as a probationer of the Church of Scotland in 1810, and ordained minister of the Low church, Paisley, in 1811. He was a man of great energy and activity, a popular preacher, a laborious worker in his parish and town, a strenuous supporter of the evangelical party in the church, and one of the foremost opponents of lay patronage. In 1815, impressed with the spiritual wants of his countrymen in the colonies, he helped to form a colonial society for supplying them with ministers, and of this society he continued the mainspring for fifteen years. Joining the Free Church of Scotland in 1843, he was sent by the general assembly in 1844 to the United States, to cultivate fraternal relations with the churches there, and in 1845 he accepted an invitation to be minister of Knox Presbyterian Church (Toronto), in which charge he remained till 1856, when he was appointed professor of church history and apologetics in Knox College (Toronto), a theological institution of the presbyterian church. Burns took a most lively interest in his church, moving about with great activity over the whole colony, and becoming acquainted with almost every congregation. He died in 1869.

Works
He was the author of several works. These include A Historical Dissertation on the Law and Practice of Great Britain with regard to the Poor (1819), On Pluralities (1824), The Gareloch Heresy tried (1830), Life of Stevenson Macgill, D.D.
(1842). Besides writing these works, he edited in 1828 a new edition of Wodrow's History of the Sufferings of the Church of Scotland, from the Restoration to the Revolution, in 4 volumes., contributing a life of the author; and for three years (1838–40) he edited and contributed many papers to the Edinburgh Christian Instructor, which had been a powerful organ of the evangelical party in the church when edited by Andrew Mitchell Thomson.

An Essay on the Office and Duties of the Eldership in the Church of Scotland  (Paisley,  1818)
Historical Dissertations on the Lata and Practice of Great Britain,  and particidarly of Scotland, with regard to the Poor  (Edinburgh, 1819)
Plurality of Offices in the Church of Scotland Examined  (Glasgow,  1824)
Three Letters to a  Friend on the Moral Bearings of the Bible Society Controversy  (Edinburgh, 1827)
The Gareloch Heresy tried (1830)
Memoir of the Rev. Stevenson M'Gill,  D.D.  (Edinburgh,  1842)  [vide Plagiarisms of Rev.  Dr R.  Burns,  one of the Ministers of Paisley,  detected and exposed  (Edinburgh,  1842)].
He edited a new edition of Robert Wodrow's  History of the Sufferings of the Church of Scotland,  4 vols. (Glasgow,  1828-31),  contributing a  Memoir of the author  ;  and for three years  (1838-40) he edited,  and wrote many papers in,  the Edinburgh Christian Instructor.

Family
He married
(1)  8 July 1814,  Janet  (died 14 November 1841), daughter of John Orr,  manufacturer,  Paisley, and had issue —
Agnes,  born 22 April 1816,  died 1st January 1820
John,  born 30 July 1819,  died 29 January 1820
John Orr, born 4  January 1821,  died 13 July 1831
Robert,  born 4  August 1822,  died 2  January 1823
James Orr,  born 2  November 1823, student at University of Glasgow in 1840
Robert Ferrier,  D.D.,  minister of Chalmers Presbyterian Church,  Kingston,  Canada, 1847-55,  Knox Church,  St Catherine's, Canada,  1855-67,  Scots Church,  Chicago, 1867-70,  Cote Street Church,  Montreal, 1870-75,  Fort Massey Presbyterian Church, Halifax,  Nova Scotia,  1875,  born 23 December 1826,  died at Broughty Ferry,  5 April 1896
William,  born 16 August 1831
(2) 12 December 1844,  Elizabeth Bell  (died without issue 22 August 1882),  daughter of Thomson Bonar of Grove.

References

Citations

Sources

King, John M. (John Mark), 1829-1899, The Good Fight : A sermon preached in the Presbyterian Church, Gould St., Toronto, on August 22nd, 1869 on occasion of the death of the Rev. Robert Burns. Toronto: Adam, Stevenson & Co., 1869.

Willis, Michael, 1798-1879, Death Made Tributary to the Glory of God : A sermon preached in Gould Street Presbyterian Church, Toronto, on Sabbath, 22nd August, 1869, on occasion of the death of the Rev. Dr. Burns, professor of church history in Knox College. Adam, Stevenson & Co., 1869.

External links

 In Memoriam: Mrs. Elizabeth B. Burns, died 22nd August 1882, age 71. Toronto: Printed for the Murray-Mitchell Auxiliary of the Women's Foreign Missionary Society of the Presbyterian Church in Canada, 1882. (Elizabeth B. Burns, 1811-1882, was the wife of Dr. Robert Burns.)
 Reply to the Reverend Dr. Cahill on the Eucharist by Robert Burns, D. D. Toronto, 1863.
 Robert Burns in Ewing, Annals of the Free Church of Scotland, with Supplementary Information

Attribution

19th-century Ministers of the Free Church of Scotland
Scottish Calvinist and Reformed theologians
1789 births
1869 deaths